Aboitiz may refer to:

Jon Ramon Aboitiz (1948–2018), Filipino businessman
Aboitiz Equity Ventures, a Philippine holding company
Aboitiz Air, a defunct Filipino airline
Aboitiz Football Cup, a football competition held in Cebu, Philippines